Beyond a Dream is the second album by By All Means in 1989 on Island Records. The album includes the hits "Let's Get It On" and "Do You Remember".

Track listing

References
 [ Allmusic]
 Discogs

External links
 
 Beyond A Dream at Discogs
 Facebook Page
 Soulwalking page

1989 albums
Island Records albums